Dheer (also spelled as Dhir) is a surname found among the Khatris of Punjab. The Dhirs of Kapurthala are descended from Baba Mahya , who was the Guru (teacher) of Guru Amardās of the Sikhs , and is still revered at Dhir weddings. The word "Dhir" translates to brave. Khulasat-ut-Tawarikh, a persian language book about history of India and Mughal Empire was written by Sujan Rai, a Dhir Khatri of Batala in Gurdaspur.Dhirs of Batala moved there before the end of Akbar's reign as soldiers. Bhai Bula, a Dhir Khatri was a dedicated Sikh of the time of Guru Arjan Sahib. His son, Dayal Das Dhir was martyred during a battle against the Mughals in Amritsar.

Customs 
The Dheers marry with Puri , Bhandari, Tuli, Khosla and other clans among Bunjahi Khatris.

As per a legend, a man of the Dhir clan had fought with thieves even after losing his head, seeing his valor a Sidhu Jatt woman  kept watching the scene. The woman was rebuked for standing there and tauntingly asked if it was her husband's head. She replied that it was indeed her husband's head and thereafter became a Sati. As a custom, the Dhirs of Ludhiana feast a woman from the Sidhu clan of Jats on the occasion of a birth of a son.

Notable people 

 Anuja Dhir, the first non-white judge to be appointed to sit at the Old Bailey.

 Ashwni Dhir, director of "Athithi Tum Kab Jaoge" and producer of "Taarak Mehta Ka Ooltah Chashmah"
 Maninder Singh Dhir, Indian politician
 Nikitin Dheer, Indian actor
 Pankaj Dheer, Indian actor who played Karna in TV series Mahabharat
 Ravinder Kumar Dhir, Air Marshal in Indian Air Force
 Santokh Singh Dhir, Punjabi language writer
 Vijay K. Dhir, former Dean of the University of California, Los Angeles (UCLA)

References

Indian surnames